Jock may refer to:

Common meanings
 Jock (stereotype), a North American term for a stereotypical male athlete
 Jock, a derogatory term for Scottish people mostly used by the English
 Short for jockstrap, an item of male protective undergarment
 Jocks, male briefs in Australian slang

Places
 Jock River, Canada
 Jocks Lagoon, Tasmania

People
 Jock (given name), a list of people with the first name or nickname
 Jock (cartoonist) (born 1972), British comic book artist Mark Simpson
 Charles Jock (born 1989), American middle-distance runner
 Duach Jock (born 1986), South Sudanese soccer player

Fictional characters
 Jock, pilot in game Deus Ex
 Jock, a Scottish Terrier in Lady and the Tramp and Lady and the Tramp II: Scamp's Adventure
 Wee Jock, a Highland Terrier in Hamish Macbeth
 Jock Ewing, in Dallas on television
 Jock Lindsey, a pilot from Raiders of the Lost Ark

Other uses
 Jocks (film), a 1987 film
 The Jocks, the British Army 9th (Scottish) Division
 Jock, a dog, subject of the book Jock of the Bushveld by Sir Percy Fitzpatrick

See also
 Disc jockey
 Jock itch, an infection of the groin region
 The Jocks and the Geordies, a comic strip
 Jocky
 Shock jock